Gubkinsky is a town in Yamalo-Nenets Autonomous Okrug, Russia, located on the left bank of the Pyakupur River, south of Salekhard. Population:  20,407 (2002 Census); 9,676 (1989 Census).

History
The town is named after the Soviet geologist Ivan Gubkin. It was founded on April 22, 1986 as an oil-extracting settlement. Town status was granted to it in 1997.

Administrative and municipal status
Within the framework of administrative divisions, it is incorporated as the town of okrug significance of Gubkinsky—an administrative unit with the status equal to that of the districts. As a municipal division, the town of okrug significance of Gubkinsky is incorporated as Gubkinsky Urban Okrug.

References

Notes

Sources

External links

Official website of Gubkinsky  
Gubkinsky Business Directory  

Cities and towns in Yamalo-Nenets Autonomous Okrug
Socialist planned cities